There are two forms of respiratory distress syndrome:
 ARDS, which is acute (or adult) respiratory distress syndrome
 Infant respiratory distress syndrome (IRDS), which is a complication of premature birth, also known as hyaline membrane disease (HMD)

Also, respiratory distress can mean:
 Shortness of breath
 Respiratory failure